Heterogramma is a genus of moths of the family Noctuidae. The genus was erected by Achille Guenée in 1854.

Species
Heterogramma aeripalpis Snellen, 1880 Sulawesi
Heterogramma biangula Bethune-Baker, 1908 New Guinea
Heterogramma circumflexalis Guenée, 1854 Brazil
Heterogramma clavalis Snellen, 1880 Sulawesi
Heterogramma contempta Schaus, 1913 Costa Rica
Heterogramma didyma Snellen, 1880 Sulawesi
Heterogramma fuscicollis Snellen, 1880 Sulawesi
Heterogramma micculalis Guenée, 1854 Haiti
Heterogramma pseudopsodos Snellen, 1880 Sulawesi
Heterogramma terminalis (Herrich-Schäffer, 1870) Cuba

References

Herminiinae